Alexander Michael Somlyay (born 18 January 1946), Australian politician, was a Liberal member of the Australian House of Representatives from March 1990 to August 2013, representing the Division of Fairfax, Queensland.

Born in Budapest, he came to Australia as a child. He was educated at the Australian National University. Before entering politics he was a public servant, consultant economist and company director.

Somlyay was a member of the informal conservative faction the Lyons Forum when it was active in the 1990s. On 25 September 2010, Somlyay announced his current term in parliament would be his last.

Expenses investigation
An investigation by a Fairfax Media reporter published in the Sydney Morning Herald in January 2014 alleged that Somlyay had used his parliamentary office to pay his wife almost seventy thousand dollars for the year 2012-13 "for non-existent work in his electorate office." The report also alleged that Somlyay had obscured his wife's identity in his list of employed staff. Somlyay defended the payments from his taxpayer-funded budget to his wife, claiming that he had done nothing wrong. On February of the same year, the Herald again reported that the Australian Federal Police had found nothing that "would constitute a criminal offence" related to the employment of his wife and closed the investigation.

References

1946 births
Living people
Australian National University alumni
Liberal Party of Australia members of the Parliament of Australia
Liberal National Party of Queensland members of the Parliament of Australia
Members of the Australian House of Representatives
Members of the Australian House of Representatives for Fairfax
Hungarian emigrants to Australia
People who lost Hungarian citizenship
Naturalised citizens of Australia
People from the Sunshine Coast, Queensland
21st-century Australian politicians
20th-century Australian politicians